Chariesthes angolensis is a species of beetle in the family Cerambycidae. It was described by Stephan von Breuning in 1968. It is known from Angola.

References

Endemic fauna of Angola
Chariesthes
Beetles described in 1968